The North Carolina Tar Heels football statistical leaders are individual statistical leaders of the North Carolina Tar Heels football program in various categories. These categories include passing, rushing, receiving, total offense, all-purpose yardage, defensive stats, and kicking. Within those areas, the lists identify single-game, single-season, and career leaders. The Tar Heels represent University of North Carolina at Chapel Hill in the NCAA's Atlantic Coast Conference.

Although North Carolina began competing in intercollegiate football in 1888, the school's official record generally does not include statistics from before the 1940s, as records from earlier years are often incomplete and inconsistent.

These lists are dominated by more recent players for several reasons:
 Since 1940s, seasons have increased from 10 games to 11 and then 12 games in length.
 The NCAA didn't allow freshmen to play varsity football until 1972 (with the exception of the World War II years), allowing players to have four-year careers.
 Bowl games only began counting toward single-season and career statistics in 2002. The Tar Heels have played in 9 bowl games since this decision, giving many recent players an extra game to accumulate statistics.

These lists are updated through North Carolina's game against Georgia Tech on November 19, 2022. Note that the NCAA does not officially recognize statistics for Hakeem Nicks and Deunta Williams, who were implicated in the scandal that caused the Tar Heels to retroactively forfeit all wins in the 2008 and 2009 seasons. However, the full stats of these players are listed in the school's media guide, and also here. The NCAA continues to recognize statistics from those seasons amassed by players who were not implicated in the scandal.

Passing

Passing yards

Passing touchdowns

Rushing

Rushing yards

Rushing touchdowns

Receiving

Receptions

Receiving yards

Receiving touchdowns

Total offense
Total offense is the sum of passing and rushing statistics. It does not include receiving or returns.

Total offense yards

Touchdowns responsible for
In official NCAA records, "touchdowns responsible for" includes rushing and passing touchdowns, but not receptions or returns—the same statistical categories used to measure total offense.

All-purpose yardage
All-purpose yardage is the sum of all yards credited to a player who is in possession of the ball. It includes rushing, receiving, and returns, but does not include passing.

North Carolina's media guide fully lists career and single-season leaders in all-purpose yards, but does not break down their performances by type of play. It only lists the single-game leader, but does fully break down his performance.

Defense

Interceptions

Tackles

Sacks

Kicking

Field goals made

References

North Carolina